Kandyla or Kandila may refer to several villages in Greece:

Kandila, Aetolia-Acarnania, a village in the municipal unit Alyzia, Aetolia-Acarnania
Kandila, Arcadia, a village in the municipal unit Levidi, Arcadia 
Kandila, Heraklion, a village in the municipal unit Gortyna, Heraklion regional unit